Northern krill (Meganyctiphanes norvegica) is a species of krill that lives in the North Atlantic Ocean. It is an important component of the zooplankton, providing food for whales, seals, fish and birds. (In the Southern Ocean, Antarctic krill Euphausia superba fills a similar role.) M. norvegica is the only species recognised in the genus Meganyctiphanes, although it has been known by several synonyms:
Euphausia intermedia 
Euphausia lanei Holt & Tattersall, 1905
Meganyctiphanes calmani 
Nyctiphanes norvegicus G. O. Sars, 1883
Thysanopoda norvegica

References

External links 

Krill
Crustaceans of the Atlantic Ocean
Crustaceans described in 1856